Jafariyeh (also Romanized as Jaʿfarīyeh; also known as Kārīz-e ‘Omar (Persian: كاريزعمر), Kahrīz-e ‘Omar, and Karez-i-Umar) is a village in Qaleh Hamam Rural District, Salehabad County, Razavi Khorasan Province, Iran. At the 2006 census, its population was 545, in 142 families.

References 

Populated places in   Torbat-e Jam County